The Shreveport–Bossier City–Minden combined statistical area was made up of four parishes in northwestern Louisiana. The statistical area consisted of then-Shreveport–Bossier City metropolitan statistical area and then-Minden micropolitan statistical area. As of the 2010 census, the CSA had a population of 439,000 (though a July 1, 2011 estimate placed the population at 444,000). On February 28, 2013, OMB changed definitions of census statistical areas, and all four parishes in this combined statistical area were redefined as Shreveport–Bossier City metropolitan statistical area.

Cities and suburbs

Cities 
 Bossier City (principal city and suburb)
 Mansfield
 Minden (principal city)
 Shreveport (principal city)
 Springhill

Towns 
 Benton
 Blanchard (suburb)
 Cotton Valley
 Cullen
 Greenwood (suburb)
 Haughton (suburb)
 Keachie
 Logansport
 Oil City
 Plain Dealing
 Sarepta
 Sibley
 Stonewall (suburb)
 Vivian

Villages 
 Belcher
 Dixie Inn
 Doyline
 Dubberly
 Gilliam
 Grand Cane
 Heflin
 Hosston
 Ida
 Longstreet
 Mooringsport
 Rodessa
 Shongaloo
 South Mansfield
 Stanley

Census-designated places 
 Eastwood (suburb)
 Frierson
 Gloster
 Lakeview (suburb)
 Red Chute (suburb)

Unincorporated communities 

Bossier Side
 Arkana
 Atkins
 Elm Grove
 Fillmore
 Midway
 Princeton
 Rocky Mount
 Taylortown

Caddo Side
 Bethany
 Conn
 Crosskeys
 Dixie
 Forbing
 Keithville (suburb)
 Spring Ridge
 Three States
 Zylks

DeSoto Side
 Kingston
 Pelican

Webster Side
 Midway
 Yellow Pine

Demographics 
As of the census of 2010, there were 439,000 people, 189,000 households, and 132,190 families residing within the CSA. The racial makeup of the CSA was 59.48% White, 37.68% African American, 0.42% Native American, 0.74% Asian, 0.04% Pacific Islander, 0.54% from other races, and 1.09% from two or more races. Hispanic or Latino of any race were 1.82% of the population.

The median income for a household in the CSA was $31,833, and the median income for a family was $38,182. Males had a median income of $31,273 versus $21,613 for females. The per capita income for the CSA was $16,192.

See also 
 Louisiana census statistical areas
 List of cities, towns, and villages in Louisiana
 List of census-designated places in Louisiana

References 

Geography of Bossier Parish, Louisiana
Geography of Caddo Parish, Louisiana
Geography of DeSoto Parish, Louisiana
Geography of Webster Parish, Louisiana
Combined statistical areas of the United States